Franck Avitabile (born 24 November 1971) is a jazz pianist.

Avitabile has synesthesia. He is also the composer of 60 published compositions.

Awards and honors
 Second Grand Prize - Concours International de la Ville de Paris - Martial Solal Piano Jazz International Competition 1998
 DjangodOr - Best First Record Album, France 1999
 Victoires de la Musique - Revelation of the year 2004
 CHOC Jazzman magazine for the album Just Play, 2006
 CHOC Jazzman magazine for the album Short Stories, 2006
 FIP Radio CD of the month for the album Paris Sketches, 2009

Discography 

Sources:

References

External links
Official Website (French/English)
Manukatche
French music.org

1971 births
Living people
Musicians from Lyon
French jazz pianists
20th-century French male pianists
21st-century French male pianists
French male jazz musicians